In baseball, a switch-pitcher is an ambidextrous pitcher who is able to pitch with either the right or left hand from the pitcher's mound.

History

19th-century
Four 19th-century pitchers are known to have thrown with both hands: Tony Mullane in 1882 and in 1893, Elton Chamberlain in 1888, Larry Corcoran in 1884, and George Wheeler.

Negro leagues
Negro league switch-pitcher Larry Kimbrough was a natural left-hander, but learned to throw right-handed as a child while recuperating from an injury.

Major League Baseball (modern era)
Greg A. Harris was one of few major league pitchers in the modern era to pitch with both his left and his right arm, though he only did so in a single Major League game. A natural right-hander, by 1986 he could throw well enough left-handed that he felt capable of pitching with either arm in a game. Harris did not throw left-handed in a regular-season game until September 28, 1995, the penultimate game of his career. Pitching for the Montreal Expos against the Cincinnati Reds in the ninth inning, Harris retired Reggie Sanders pitching right-handed, then switched to his left hand for the next two hitters, Hal Morris and Eddie Taubensee, who were both left-handed batters. Harris walked Morris but got Taubensee to ground out. He then went back to his right hand to retire Bret Boone to end the inning.

Pat Venditte, a Major League pitcher from 2015 to 2020, regularly pitched with both arms.  Venditte was drafted by the New York Yankees, played for the Seattle Mariners, Toronto Blue Jays, Philadelphia Phillies, Oakland Athletics, Los Angeles Dodgers, San Francisco Giants and Miami Marlins. 

Current Major League right-handed pitcher Yu Darvish throws with his left hand when training to keep both arms strong and balanced, but does not pitch left-handed in games.

Collegiate
In 2003, the Atlanta Braves drafted switch pitcher Brandon Berdoll of Temple (Texas) Junior College in the 27th round. He never made it to the major leagues.

Matt Brunnig (Harvard University class of 2006–07) was able to pitch over 85 mph left-handed and over 90 mph right-handed, but only pitched with both arms in the same game a few times. In college, he pitched more from the right side as a starter and pitched some relief as a lefty although he did start one game left-handed.  When playing the outfield after a start he would typically play the position with the other arm to rest the arm he just pitched with.

Judson University hurler Ryan Perez made national headlines in 2014 playing collegiate summer baseball with the Hyannis Harbor Hawks of the Cape Cod Baseball League. Perez took home the league's annual All-Star Game MVP award after a dominating performance pitching from both sides.

Training methods
Switch-throwers are commonly taught to switch-throw at a young age. For instance, Venditte's father trained him in ambidextrous throwing from the age of three and Brunnig's father taught him from age five.

Controversy
In 2008, while with the Staten Island Yankees, the New York Yankees' Single-A affiliate, switch pitcher Pat Venditte opposed switch hitter Ralph Henriquez, Venditte switched his modified glove to his left arm. (Hitters traditionally derive advantages from batting from the opposite side of the plate to the pitcher's throwing arm.) Henriquez then switched to batting left-handed, and a series of changes continued for several minutes. This prompted the Professional Baseball Umpires Corporation (PBUC) to issue a new rule about switch-pitching. In short, switch pitchers must indicate to the umpire, batter, and any runners the hand which they will use to pitch. The pitcher must continue using this hand for the duration of the at bat, with some exceptions for injury and the use of pinch hitters. Following this choice, batters can then select with which hand they will bat.

References

Further reading

The Associated Press. "Ambidextrous pitcher stars at Creighton". MSNBC, May 3, 2006. Accessed 12 June 2007.
Holtzman, Jerome. "A lesson in switch-pitching". MajorLeagueBaseball.com via the Internet Archive, March 3, 2000. Accessed 12 June 2007.

Handedness in baseball
Baseball pitching